Linville Railway station was the largest railhead for beef cattle in South East Queensland, the second largest in the southern hemisphere. Linville is a small town in the Somerset Region local government area.

In 1910, the Brisbane Valley railway line reached Linville.

See also

Brisbane Valley Rail Trail
Rail transport in Queensland

References 

Railway stations in Somerset Region
Railway stations in Australia opened in 1910